The Monument, formerly known as Rushmore Plaza Civic Center and Rushmore Plaza, is a  exhibition center, in Rapid City, South Dakota. The Monument is the main event center for the Black Hills Region, serving Western South Dakota, South West North Dakota, North West Nebraska, and Eastern Wyoming.  It is home to many large annual events, including the Black Hills Stock Show and Rodeo & Rodeo Rapid City, Lakota Nation Invitational, the Black Hills Homebuilders Expo, South Dakota High School Activities Association Tournaments, the Rapid City Rush ice hockey team of the ECHL, and the Rapid City Marshals of Champions Indoor Football. The Rapid City Thrillers semi-professional basketball team also formerly played games at the complex. The grand opening event was a concert by Elvis Presley on June 21, 1977, which was filmed for a CBS television special that aired in October. The concert was during the singer's final tour before his death on August 16, 1977.

It contains two multi-purpose arenas: an ice arena, home to the Rapid City Rush hockey team, and the 10,000-seat Summit Arena completed in October 2021 that is home to the Rapid City Marshals. The venue also contains a fieldhouse, a fine arts theatre, two large convention/exhibit halls, and numerous other meeting rooms. After the venue was remodeled in 2021, the Rushmore Plaza Civic Center was renamed The Monument after a naming rights agreement with Monument Health Rapid City Hospital.

References

External links
Official website

Indoor arenas in South Dakota
Indoor ice hockey venues in the United States
Sports venues in South Dakota
Basketball venues in South Dakota
Buildings and structures in Rapid City, South Dakota
Tourist attractions in Rapid City, South Dakota
1977 establishments in South Dakota
Sports venues completed in 1977